The Hero of Two Worlds is a name used to refer to several historic figures, known for their accomplishments in both the Old and New Worlds. Prominent figures called this include:

 Gilbert du Motier, Marquis de Lafayette (1757–1834), for his accomplishments in the service of both France and the United States
 Giuseppe Garibaldi (1807–1882), for his military enterprises in South America and Europe
 Tadeusz Kościuszko (1746–1817), a national hero in Poland, Lithuania, Belarus, and the United States
 Casimir Pulaski (1745–1779), a Polish nobleman who fought for independence and freedom in both Poland and the United States
 Peter I of Brazil and IV of Portugal (1798–1834), a Portuguese dynast who declare the Brazilian independence and became the first Emperor of new country, before returning to Portugal to restore the constitutional monarchy in a civil war against his brother

in other uses:
 Hero of Two Worlds: The Marquis de Lafayette in the Age of Revolution, a biography by Mike Duncan about the Marquis de Lafayette